Kerner House is a historic house located at 1012 Monroe Street in Gretna, Louisiana, United States. The house was built sometime in the 1870s by the Kerner family. the house is a one-story frame raised cottage in Greek Revival/Italianate style. The house is currently privately owned and is in a state of disrepair and is heavily damaged by plant growth and termites.

The house was listed on the National Register of Historic Places on January 28, 2000.

See also
 National Register of Historic Places listings in Jefferson Parish, Louisiana
 Timothy P. Kerner Sr., descendant of the original owner

References

Houses in Jefferson Parish, Louisiana
Greek Revival houses in Louisiana